Sir George Claus Rankin PC (12 August 1877 – 8 April 1946) was a British judge in India.

Rankin was born in Lamington, Lanarkshire, the son of Rev. Robert Rankin. He was educated at the University of Edinburgh, where he graduated M.A., and where his essay on “Democracy in literature” was awarded the Edinburgh University Club of London Triennial Prize in 1898, and Trinity College, Cambridge. He was admitted at Lincoln's Inn and called to the bar in 1904. He served in the First World War with the Royal Garrison Artillery.

He went to India in 1918 and served first as a puisne judge of the High Court of Calcutta, and then as Chief Justice, from 1926 to 1934.   While in India, in 1919 he was given a temporary commission as Major in the Calcutta University Infantry of the Indian Defence Force.

Upon his return to Britain, he was sworn to the Privy Council, entitling him to sit on the Judicial Committee of the Privy Council, at that time the court of last resort for India and other parts of the British Empire.

Publications
George Claus Rankin, Background to Indian Law (Cambridge:  University Press, 1946).

References 

British India judges
Judges of the Calcutta High Court
20th-century Indian judges
Members of the Judicial Committee of the Privy Council
1877 births
1946 deaths
Chief Justices of the Calcutta High Court
Members of the Privy Council of the United Kingdom
Alumni of the University of Edinburgh
Alumni of Trinity College, Cambridge
People from South Lanarkshire
Knights Bachelor
Judges in British India
British people in colonial India